Badamestan (also Romanized as Bādāmestān; also known as Bādāmestān-e Pā’īn) is a village in Olya Tayeb Rural District, in the Central District of Landeh County, Kohgiluyeh and Boyer-Ahmad Province, Iran. At the 2006 census, its population was 43, in 6 families.

References 

Populated places in Landeh County